The 15th Kansas Volunteer Cavalry Regiment was a cavalry regiment that served in the Union Army during the American Civil War and American Indian Wars.

Service
The 15th Kansas Cavalry was organized at Leavenworth, Kansas on October 17, 1863. It mustered in for three years under the command of Colonel Charles R. Jennison. The regiment was attached to District of the Border, Department of Missouri, to January 1864. Department of Kansas to June 1864. Districts of North and South Kansas, Department of Missouri, to October 1865. The majority of the regiment mustered out of service on October 19, 1865. Company H mustered out of service on December 7, 1865.

Detailed service
Assigned to duty at Leavenworth and in November 1863 went into winter quarters at Fort Riley, Kansas. In the Spring, they served at various points in southern Kansas and northern Missouri in frontier garrison duty with headquarters in Humboldt, Kansas. The locations are: Fort Leavenworth, Kansas (Companies A,B,G and H); Emporia, Kansas (Company M); Olathe, Kansas (Company K); Humboldt, Kansas (Company E); Topeka, Kansas (Company F); Paola, Kansas (Company C); along with Kansas City, Missouri (Companies I and L) and West Point, Missouri (Company D). Skirmish at Clear Creek, Missouri, May 16, 1864 (detachments of Companies D and L). Scout from Fort Leavenworth to Weston, Missouri, June 13–16, 1864. Expedition into Missouri June 16–20 (Companies B, C, and G). Price's Raid in Missouri and Kansas September to November. Lexington October 19. Little Blue October 21. Independence, Big Blue, and State Line October 22. Westport October 23. Coldwater Grove, Osage, October 24. Mine Creek, Little Osage River, and battle of Charlot October 25. Newtonia October 28. Duty in the Department of Kansas and Department of the Missouri until October 1865. The majority of the regiment mustered out of service on October 19, 1865. Company H joined the middle column of the Powder River Expedition under Lieutenant Colonel Samuel Walker in July, 1865 and marched from Fort Laramie, Dakota Territory to the Powder River then to Fort Connor, July 11 - September 20. Actions with Indians September 1–11 on Powder River, Montana Territory. Company H mustered out December 6, 1865.

Casualties
The regiment lost a total of 100 men during its service, 2 officers and 19 enlisted men killed or mortally wounded, and 2 officers and 77 enlisted men who died of disease.

Commanders
 Colonel Charles R. Jennison
 Lieutenant Colonel George Henry Hoyt

Notable members
 Private David Lewis Payne, Company H - "Father" of Oklahoma
 Captain Orloff Norton, Company L - Namesake of Norton County, Kansas, killed near Cane Hill, Washington County, Arkansas, on November 11, 1864.
 2nd Lieutenant David John Mosher Wood, Company B - Brother of Samuel Newitt Wood
 Captain Orren Arms Curtis, Company F - Married to a Kaw Native American. Their son was Charles Curtis, 31st Vice President of the United States.

See also

 List of Kansas Civil War Units
 Kansas in the Civil War

References

 Dyer, Frederick H. A Compendium of the War of the Rebellion (Des Moines, IA: Dyer Pub. Co.), 1908.
 Official Military History of Kansas Regiments During the War for the Suppression of the Great Rebellion (Leavenworth, KS: W. S. Burke), 1870.
Attribution

External links
 History of the 15th Kansas Cavalry by the Museum of the Kansas National Guard

Military units and formations established in 1863
Military units and formations disestablished in 1865
Units and formations of the Union Army from Kansas
1863 establishments in Kansas